The handball men's tournament at the 2019 Pan American Games in Lima, Peru was held between 31 July and 5 August 2019. Eight nations participated.

Qualification 
A total of eight men's teams qualified to compete at the games in each tournament. The host nation (Peru) qualified in each tournament, along with seven other teams in various qualifying tournaments.

Summary

 Chile (3rd placed finisher at the South American Games) and Colombia (5th at the Central American and Caribbean Games) competed in the last chance tournament.

North Zone Qualifying

United States won 63–51 on aggregate.

Last chance qualification tournament

Chile won 76–49 on aggregate.

Results 
All times are in Peru Time. (UTC−5)

Preliminary round

Group A

Group B

Classification round

5–8th place semifinals

Seventh place match

Fifth place match

Medal round

Semifinals

Bronze medal match

Gold medal match

Ranking and statistics

Top scorers

Source: Lima 2019

Top goalkeepers

Source: Lima 2019

References 

Men